Syllepte segnalis is a moth in the family Crambidae. It was described by John Henry Leech in 1889. It is endemic to Japan.

The forewings are brownish black, with a pale yellow discal spot and a wavy central band on the wing. The under surface are as above, but the markings are not so distinct.

References

Moths described in 1889
Moths of Japan
segnalis
Taxa named by John Henry Leech